Allardice Castle (also spelled Allardyce) is a sixteenth-century manor house in Kincardineshire, Scotland. It is approximately 1.5 kilometres north-west of the town of Inverbervie.  The Bervie Water flows around Allardice Castle on both sides. Allardice may be viewed as one of a chain of coastal castles; to the north are Dunnottar Castle (ruined), Fetteresso Castle, Cowie Castle (ruined) and Muchalls Castle. The castle is a category A listed building. Allardice castle was the chief seat of the Barons of Allardice, an ancient family who first appear in an 1197 charter. Since 1542 (the time at which the current L-plan building was built) many alterations and changes have been made to the original structure.

References

External links

Castles in Aberdeenshire
Houses in Aberdeenshire
Kincardine and Mearns
Category A listed buildings in Aberdeenshire
Listed castles in Scotland